William Lancaster, sometimes known as Lanky Lancaster, was a Scottish football outside right who made 110 appearances in the Scottish League for Cowdenbeath. He also played league football for Clackmannan.

Personal life 
Prior to becoming a footballer, Lancaster was an apprentice jockey at Epsom Downs Racecourse. He served in the Royal Navy during the First World War.

Career statistics

Honours 
Cowdenbeath

Scottish League Second Division (2): 1913–14, 1914–15

Individual

Cowdenbeath Hall of Fame

References

Scottish footballers
Cowdenbeath F.C. players
Scottish Football League players
Year of birth missing
Year of death missing
People from Alloa
Association football outside forwards
Alloa Athletic F.C. players
Clackmannan F.C. players
Royal Navy personnel of World War I
Crystal Palace F.C. wartime guest players
Sportspeople from Clackmannanshire
Scottish jockeys